The  Great Suburb Synagogue  was a synagogue at Bożnicza-Street 16 in Lviv, Ukraine.

History
The synagogue was located on the Kraków suburb (therefore the building received the name), in the street Bożnicza, 16. The synagogue was built in 1624–1630. Long time it remained a unique stone construction in district. Support and arches in the Great Suburb Synagogue divided overlapping into practically equal nine fields. In 1798 to the prayer hall for men, two branches for women from southern and northern part were attached.

To the Great Suburb Synagogue small prayer houses were attached. They were placed in ground-floor as  one-storied outhouses of synagogues:  
 The Menakrim Synagogue
 The Zowche Cedek Synagogue
 The Melamdim Synagogue
 The Hajutim Hdalim Synagogue
 The Cijerim Synagogue

It was devastated by the Nazis in 1941. It was not rebuilt after war. A commemorative plaque was erected on a neighbouring building.

References

External links
Synagogues in Lviv

Synagogues in Lviv
Synagogues destroyed by Nazi Germany
Former synagogues in Ukraine
Baroque synagogues in Ukraine
Buildings and structures demolished in 1941
Synagogues completed in the 1790s
Buildings and structures destroyed during World War II